Eduard Philip Spanjaard (born 22 December 1948), known professionally as Ed Spanjaard, is a Dutch conductor and pianist.

Early life
Spanjaard was born in 1948 in Haarlem. His father was a psychiatrist and amateur pianist, and his mother a flautist and music teacher. Spanjaard studied at the Conservatorium van de Vereniging Muzieklyceum at Amsterdam, and then at the Guildhall School of Music and Drama in London. During his studies he was, in addition to conducting amateur ensembles like the Leids Studenten Kamer Orkest (LeSKO), assistant to Bernard Haitink, George Solti, and Herbert von Karajan.

Career
In London, Spanjaard worked as répétiteur of the Royal Opera Covent Garden. In 1978, he conducted the London Philharmonic Orchestra in Mozart's Così fan tutte during the Glyndebourne Festival. In 1980 and 1981 he was assistant-conductor to Herbert von Karajan at the Salzburger Festspiele. For the Bayreuther Festspiele in 1983, he was the assistant of George Solti in Wagner's Ring des Nibelungen, which laid the foundation for his work in the opera. For several years, he was principal guest conductor of the Nederlands Balletorkest and the Limburgs Symfonie Orkest (LSO) (1982–1988), and has directed almost all Dutch orchestras. Since 1982 Spanjaard has been principal conductor of the Nieuw Ensemble, which was awarded the Prins Bernardfonds muziekprijs in 1998.

As guest conductor Spajaard performed all over the world. In recent years he has conducted in the contemporary and classical repertoire. In the Netherlands he directed Verdi's Rigoletto with the De Nederlandse Opera, Gounod's Faust and Verdi's Don Carlos with the Nationale Reisopera and with the Opera Zuid Puccini's La Bohème and Madame Butterfly as well as Humperdinck's Hänsel und Gretel. Also with the Residentie Orkest and abroad (Canada) he made several opera productions. In 2000 at the Rotterdam Ahoy he conducted the Nederlands Balletorkest in Verdi's La Traviata and Britten's Peter Grimes with the Nationale Reisopera. He premiered the chamber-operas Wolf Cub Village and Night Banquet from the Chinese composer Guo Wenjing with the New Ensemble. In 2004, he was invited by the opera of Lyon to conduct the opera Pelléas et Mélissande from Claude Debussy.

During a state visit of Queen Beatrix in 1995, Spanjaard conducted Mahler's Lieder aus Des Knaben Wunderhorn and symphony No. 1 in cooperation with the Israel Philharmonic Orchestra. He regularly performs with the Ensemble InterContemporain in Paris and with the Klangforum Wien. In 2000 he conducted the Ensemble Modern in Frankfurt am Main, with great success which was praised by the press. In February 2002 Spanjaard took care of the musical accompaniment for the wedding of Prince Willem-Alexander and Máxima Zorreguieta. She was particularly moved by Adiós Nonino from Ástor Piazzolla with Carel Kraayenhof on bandoneón. The success of the performance led to another CD recording with the same performers, including the Concertgebouw Kamerorkest and the Nederlands Kamerkoor.

In August 2001 Spanjaard was appointed chief conductor of the Limburgs Symfonie Orkest. Together with the LSO he performed Hans Zender's composed interpretation of Schubert's Winterreise in September 2003 during the Musica Sacra festival in Maastricht. This performance received praise from the national press and was considered the highlight of the festival. A CD recording of the LSO and the Nederlands Kamerkoor with compositions by Gabriel Fauré was also highly praised.

In 2009 Spanjaard conducted Das Rheingold, of Wagner's Ring des Nibelungen with the Nationale Reisopera and Orkest van het Oosten in Enschedé where in 2010 he conducted Die Walküre. In July 2016 Ed Spanjaard was appointed chief conductor of Orkest van het Oosten starting from season 2017–2018, following Jan Willem de Vriend.

Spanjaard was appointed Professor of Orchestral Conducting at the Amsterdam University of the Arts in September 2012.

Recordings 
 Tango Royal. Works by Astor Piazzolla, Carel Kraayenhof, Roberto D. Alvarez. Ed Spanjaard, Vesko Eschkenazy, Concertgebouw Chamber Orchestra, Sexteto Canyengue. PENTATONE PTC 5186008 (2012)
 Mozart – Arias. Lenneke Ruiten, Ed Spanjaard, Concertgebouw Chamber Orchestra. PENTATONE PTC 5186376 (2010)
 Richard Wagner. Wesendonck Lieder & Arias, Charlotte Margiono, Ed Spanjaard, Philharmonie Zuidnederland. PENTATONE PTC 5186077 (2006)
 Gabriel Fauré. Requiem and other choral works. Christiane Oelze, Ed Spanjaard, Harry Peeters, Philharmonie Zuidnederland, Netherlands Chamber Choir. PENTATONE PTC 5186020 (2005)

Awards
 Prins Bernhardfonds muziekprijs 1998
 Edison 1999
 Edison 2001

References

External links
 Spanjaard's website
 Nieuw Ensemble
 Limburgs Symfonie Orkest

Bibliography
 Jozef Robijns, Miep Zijlstra: Algemene muziekencyclopedie, Haarlem: De Haan, (1979)-1984, 

1948 births
Living people
Alumni of the Guildhall School of Music and Drama
Conservatorium van Amsterdam alumni
Dutch classical musicians
Dutch classical pianists
Dutch conductors (music)
Male conductors (music)
People from Haarlem
Répétiteurs
21st-century conductors (music)
21st-century classical pianists
21st-century male musicians